Bil Bil is an Austronesian language spoken by about 1,200 people near Madang town, Madang Province, Papua New Guinea.

References

Languages of Madang Province
Bel languages